Watch Out may refer to:

Film and fiction 
 Watch Out (film), a 2008 film by Steve Balderson
 Watch Out (1999 film), a film featuring Chin Kar-lok
 Watch Out, a 2006 novel by Joseph Suglia, basis for the 2008 film

Music

Albums 
 Watch Out! (Alexisonfire album), 2004
 Watch Out (Barrabás album), 1975
 Watch Out! (Lovex album) or the title song, 2011
 Watch Out (Patrice Rushen album) or the title song, 1987
 Watch Out (René McLean album) or the title song, 1975
 Watch Out, by Blockheads, 1998
 Watch Out, by Brandi Wells, or the title song, 1981

Songs 
 "Watch Out" (2 Chainz song), 2015
 "Watch Out" (Alex Gaudino song), 2008
 "Watch Out" (Ferry Corsten song), 2006
 "Watch Out", by ABBA from Waterloo, 1974
 "Watch Out", by Atmosphere from You Can't Imagine How Much Fun We're Having, 2005
 "Watch Out", by Chris Cornell from Scream, 2009
 "Watch Out", by David Gates from Never Let Her Go, 1975
 "Watch Out", by De La Soul from AOI: Bionix, 2001
 "Watch Out", by Dean Parrish, B-side of the single "I'm on My Way", 1967
 "Watch Out", by Fleetwood Mac from The Original Fleetwood Mac, 1971
 "Watch Out", by Jackie Wilson, 1964
 "Watch Out", by Loverboy from Get Lucky, 1981